Skorodnoye is a rural locality (a selo) and the administrative center of Skorodnyanskaya Territorial Administration, Gubkinsky District, Belgorod Oblast, Russia. The population was 3,707 as of 2010. There are 22 streets.

Geography 
Skorodnoye is located 39 km southwest of Gubkin (the district's administrative centre) by road. Korenek is the nearest rural locality.

References 

Rural localities in Gubkinsky District